I Am Here or #iamhere or IAmHere may refer to:


Films
 I Am Here (film), a 2016 Canadian animated short film
 I Am Here, also known as The 11th Hour, a 2014 film by Anders Morgenthaler
 #Iamhere, 2019 French comedy film
 I Am Here... Now, film by Neil Breen

Songs
 "I Am Here", the English-language version of "Estoy Aquí", by Shakira
 "I Am Here" ("Sono Qui" English version), by Andrea Bocelli from the album Sì, 2018
 "I Am Here (Trust Me)", a song by JK-47, 2020

Other
 I Am Here!, a Japanese manga series
 Iamhere (social movement), the #iamhere movement that counteracts hate speech and misinformation on social media

See also

 I'm Here (disambiguation)